The Azerbaijan Cup 2009–10 was the 18th season of the annual cup competition in Azerbaijan. It started on 17 September 2009 with four games of the preliminary round and ended on 22 May 2009 with the Final held at Tofiq Bahramov Stadium in Baku. FK Karabakh were the defending champions. Twenty teams competed in this year's competition.

Preliminary round
Eight lower division teams qualified for this competition played against each other over two legs and the winners of these legs joined the twelve teams of the Azerbaijan Premier League 2009–10 in the next round. The first legs were played on 17 September 2009 and the second legs were played on 22 and 23 September 2009.

|}

First round
The four winners from the preliminary round joined the 12 teams of the Azerbaijan Premier League 2009–10 in this round. The first legs took place on 4 and 5 November 2009 and the second legs took take place on 11 and 12 November 2009.

|}

Quarterfinals
The eight winners from the first round matched up in this round. The first legs took place on 6 and 7 March 2010 and the second legs took place on 17 and 18 March 2010.

|}

Semifinals
The four winners from the Quarterfinals matched up in this round. The first legs took place on 27 April 2010 and the second legs took place on 5 and 6 May 2010.

|}

Final
The two winners from the Semifinals matched up in this match.

Scorers

4 goals:
Mario Sergio, Khazar Lankaran

3 goals:

Aleksandar Šolić, Baku
Samir Aliyev, Neftchi Baku
Farid Guliyev, Standard Baku

2 goals:

Jabá, Baku
Felipe, Baku
Amiran Mujiri, Baku/Standard Baku
Robertas Poškus, Inter Baku
Asif Mammadov, Inter Baku
Bronislav Červenka, Inter Baku
Vital Lyadzyanyow, Inter Baku
Marian Aliuță, Neftchi Baku
Walter Guglielmone, Neftchi Baku
Anatolie Doroș, Olimpik-Shuvalan

1 goals:

Fábio Luís Ramim, Baku
Nijat Abdullayev, Baku
Orkhan Bashirli, Baku
Ernad Skulić, Baku
Veaceslav Sofroni, Baku
Ahmad Tijani, Baku
Kenan Kerimov, Gabala
Leo Rocha, Inter Baku
David Odikadze, Inter Baku
Ģirts Karlsons, Inter Baku
Ángel Gutiérrez, Inter Baku
Yacouba Bamba, FK Karvan
Bechir Mogaadi, FK Karvan
Kalinkov, Khazar Lankaran
Elvin Beqiri, Khazar Lankaran
Cristian, Khazar Lankaran
Allan Lalín, Khazar Lankaran
Emeka Opara, Khazar Lankaran
Denis Calincov, Khazar Lankaran
Narcisse Yaméogo, Mughan
Amit Guluzade, Neftchi Baku
Ilgar Gurbanov, Olimpik-Shuvalan
Mirko Bunjevčević, Olimpik-Shuvalan
Admir Teli, Qarabağ
Aftandil Hajiyev, Qarabağ
Emin Imamaliev, Qarabağ
Vagif Javadov, Qarabağ
Elvin Mammadov, Qarabağ
Rashad Sadygov, Qarabağ
Rüstam Mammadov, Simurq
Serhiy Artiukh, Simurq
Yuri Bulychev, Simurq
 Ugo, Standard Baku
Anton Kovalevskyi, Turan Tovuz

Unknown:

 5 Goals Bakili Baku
 4 Goals Sahdag Qusar
 3 Goals ANSAD-Petrol
 3 Goals Ganca
 3 Goals Neftchi ISM
 2 Goals FK MKT Araz
 2 Goals MOIK Baku
 1 Goals Ravan Baku

2 Own goals:
Ernani Pereira, FK Karvan against Inter Baku

1 Own goal:
Milan Zagorac, Inter Baku against Baku

References

External links
 Results

Azerbaijan Cup seasons
Azerbaijan Cup
Cup